Benjamin F. Ward, Jr. (August 2, 1948 - December 14, 2013) was an Adjunct Associate Professor in the Duke University Department of Philosophy and was the Associate Dean for Faculty Program at Duke.  He was an accomplished pianist who began playing at the age of six.  He died in 2013 in Durham, NC, after battling a long illness.

He played organ at the Ebenezer Baptist Church in 1968 for the memorial service of Martin Luther King Jr.

An obituary from the University of North Carolina School of the Arts:

Since 1980 Professor Benjamin Ward taught various courses in philosophy, Arabic language, and German studies at Duke University.  In addition, he was extraordinarily active in many aspects of undergraduate life.  He was Duke’s first faculty-member-in-residence and continued to nurture and expand the program over the years.  He directed and performed with The Pitchforks, Duke’s oldest a cappella group. Ward became an active supporter of several varsity athletic teams at Duke, including men’s and women’s cross country, track and field and soccer, and he served as a volunteer faculty athletic associate.  Beyond Duke, he was a passionate fan of the Durham Bulls Baseball Club and the Wake Forest University baseball program.
 
A graduate of Yale University, Ward participated in many aspects of musical life in New Haven, Conn.  He was often called upon to collaborate with string students at the Yale School of Music in their degree recitals, participated in master classes with Pierre Fournier, Joseph Silverstein, Janos Starker, Donald Weilerstein, and Mstislav Rostropovich, and performed on several occasions with the legendary Yale Quartet.  He also founded the Berkeley Chamber Players in Berkeley College at Yale.  Through the Chamber Players, he worked with many undergraduate musicians whose careers have subsequently placed them in major positions in orchestras and chamber ensembles throughout the world.  Among his protégés are the music director of the Baltimore Symphony, members (including principal players) of the Boston Symphony, the Chicago Symphony, the San Francisco Symphony, the Los Angeles Philharmonic, the Berlin Philharmonic, the Vienna Philharmonic, and the Royal Concertgebouw Orchestra.
 
One of the special highlights of Ward’s performing career was the chance to perform in recital with Mstislav Rostropovich in Amsterdam’s famed Concertgebouw.  He has also performed as soloist with the New Haven, Atlanta, North Carolina, Tucson, Houston, and Seattle symphonies.
 
Ward was a member of the Board of Visitors of the University of North Carolina School of the Arts and took great delight in seeing UNCSA’s students thriving and learning.  He had a special enthusiasm for inspiring young people to listen to the great works of chamber music, participate in making music, and attend concerts. 
 
For the past 20 years, Ward worked with members of the homeless community by organizing and preparing evening meals at what is now Urban Ministries of Durham.  For nearly a dozen years he was active with Rites of Passage, a mentoring group for African-American boys in Durham. He has received several awards for his involvement in community service.

Early life 
Ward spent most of childhood years in Montgomery, AL, and Berkeley, CA.

Professional career 
Academic papers include articles on Whiteheadian cosmology, Kantian ethics, various issues in aesthetics, the ethics and aesthetics of performance, and the philosophy of sport.

Musical career

A Cappella 
After moving to Duke in 1980, Ward joined the just formed a cappella group, The Duke Pitchforks.  He quickly became the musical leader of the group and became the music director in the fall of 1981. He also began arranging for the group.  Arrangements by Ward include: Georgia On My Mind (after the King's Singers) Vince Clarke's Only You, A - Roving, Clementine!, Paper Moon, Hurry Sundown, Hush, Little Baby, What Shall We Do with the Drunken Sailer, Deck the Halls, Short People, & In My Room.

References 

2013 deaths
American philosophers
Duke University faculty
Yale University alumni
1948 births
20th-century American pianists
American male pianists
20th-century American male musicians
Philosophers of sport